Girls und Panzer is a 2012 Japanese anime series produced by Actas. The series takes place in a world where girls take up  or "tankery" in the English dub, the art of operating tanks, which focuses on a girl named Miho Nishizumi and her friends as they participate in their school's sensha-dō program. The series aired in Japan between October 9, 2012 and December 25, 2012, although due to production delays, the final two episodes were postponed and were replaced with recap episodes. The final two episodes aired in March 2013. Original video animation episodes are included with the Blu-ray/DVD releases. The opening theme is "DreamRiser" by ChouCho whilst the ending theme is "Enter Enter MISSION!" performed by Mai Fuchigami, Ai Kayano, Mami Ozaki, Ikumi Nakagami and Yuka Iguchi. The series is licensed in North America by Sentai Filmworks.


Episode list

OVAs

Home media release

Japanese

English

Notes

References

Girls und Panzer